Iron Dawn may refer to:

 Iron Dawn (novel), a 1998 fantasy novel by Matthew Stover
 Iron Dawn (EP), a 2011 EP by Marduk